Liu Wen-hsiung (1941–1990) was a Taiwanese politician.

He was elected to the Legislative Yuan in 1989. After discussing national sovereignty with legislative speaker Liang Su-yung in October 1990, Liu suffered a heart attack and died in the legislature. His funeral was held in Taichung on 3 November 1990.

References

1941 births
1990 deaths
Politicians of the Republic of China on Taiwan from Changhua County
Members of the 1st Legislative Yuan in Taiwan
Democratic Progressive Party Members of the Legislative Yuan
Taichung Members of the Legislative Yuan